Kennerley Old Style is a serif typeface designed by Frederic Goudy. Kennerley is an "old-style" serif design, loosely influenced by Italian and Dutch printing traditions of the Renaissance and early modern period. It was named for New York publisher Mitchell Kennerley, who advanced Goudy money to complete the design. While Goudy had already designed 18 other typefaces, it was one of Goudy's most successful early designs in his own style. The regular or roman style was designed in 1911, the italic in 1918; bold styles followed in 1924.

Goudy was a fine art printer and later a prolific typeface designer. He designed Kennerley out of dissatisfaction with the Caslon typefaces then in use in fine art printing; he felt these had an uneven colour on the page due to the thickness of the capital letters being much greater than that of the lower case.

Goudy described the design as very loosely based on the 'Fell Types', a set of type in the Dutch style collected by Bishop John Fell of Oxford for the Oxford University Press, although he conceded that "comparison of my type with the Fell letter will disclose little more than an identity of spirit" and Walter Tracy found the claim of influence implausible. It has also been compared in some details, notably the tilted understroke on the 'e', to the type of late 15th century Venetian printer Nicolas Jenson by Walter Tracy and others; American Type Founders' historian Henry Lewis Bullen somewhat cruelly described it as "a spoilt Jenson". The italic is somewhat florid, with swashes on some letters, and additional swashes were available for other capitals. 

Initially cast privately in metal type, Kennerley was later made available on sale in metal type and for Monotype's hot metal typesetting system. During the 1910s and 1920s it was licensed in Britain by the Caslon foundry, who marketed it extensively. It has also been digitised several times.

List of metal type issues

 Kennerley Old Style (1911, Village Letter Foundry + 1920, Lanston Monotype + 1927 Continental)
 Kennerley Italic (1918, Village Letter Foundry + 1920, Lanston Monotype + 1927 Continental)
 Kennerley Bold + Bold Italic (1924, Lanston Monotype + Continental)

References

External links
 Caslon advertisement, 1922
 H.W. Caslon & Co. Ltd, specimen book, 1915
Old style serif typefaces
Letterpress typefaces
Typefaces designed by Frederic Goudy
Monotype typefaces